Scythris hierroella is a moth species of the family Scythrididae. It was described by Klimesch in 1986. It is found on the Canary Islands (El Hierro).

References

hierroella
Moths described in 1986
Moths of Africa